Julio Collado-Vides is a Guatemalan scientist and Professor of Computational Genomics at the National Autonomous University of Mexico. His research focuses on genomics and bioinformatics.

Education
Collado-Vides studied at the National Autonomous University of Mexico, gaining a BSc in biomedical science (1983), an MSc in physical chemistry (1985) and a PhD in biomathematics (1989). Following his PhD, he carried out postdoctoral studies at the Massachusetts Institute of Technology (MIT).

Work and research
Collado-Vides' research focuses on the regulation of gene expression in bacteria, in particular, creating a model of the regulatory network of E. coli K-12. The RegulonDB database (released in 2010) makes this data available. He has also been involved in the construction of the EcoCyc E. coli database and the completion of the sequenced E. coli genome.

He was the founding President of the Mexican Society of Genomics.

Awards and honours
Collado-Vides is a member of the Mexican Academy of Sciences and was elected a Fellow of the International Society for Computational Biology in 2015.

Books
Integrative Approaches to Molecular Biology, 1996, MIT Press (edited with Boris Magasanik and Temple F. Smith) 
Gene Regulation and Metabolism: Post-Genomic Computational Approaches, 2002, MIT Press (edited with Ralf Hofestädt)

References

External links
 Julio Collado-Vides homepage at UNAM CCG

Living people
1957 births
Guatemalan bioinformaticians
Members of the Mexican Academy of Sciences
Fellows of the International Society for Computational Biology